Nancy Mann Waddel Woodrow (born c. 1867 – September 7, 1935) was an American writer, often credited as Mrs. Wilson Woodrow.

Early life
Nancy Mann Waddel was born in Chillicothe, Ohio, daughter of William Waddel and Jane McCoy Waddel. (The family's surname is also seen as Waddle and Waddell.) As a young woman, Nancy Waddel was briefly the assistant editor of the Chillicothe Daily News.

Career
Novels by Nancy Waddel Woodrow, many of them focused on women characters in American West, included The Bird of Time (1907), The New Missioner (1907), The Silver Butterfly (1908, titled The Veiled Mariposa in serial form), The Beauty (1910), Sally Salt (1912), The Hornet's Nest (1917), Swallowed Up (1922), Burned Evidence (1925), Come Alone (1929), The Second Chance (1931), and The Pawns of Murder (1932). 

She also wrote many short stories and essays published in magazines, and one play (The Universal Impulse, 1911). At least two dozen films were made from stories by Nancy Waddel Woodrow,  starting from A Gypsy Madcap (1914) through six more "Olive" shorts starring Mabel Trunnelle in 1914 and 1915, and The Piper's Price (1917), and ending with the only sound adaptation, Without Children (1935). "I've flitted from flower to flower," she explained in 1922, "short stories, novels, essays, the pictures, even a play. Sometimes I've flivvered, sometimes succeeded; but I've had a beautiful time."

Personal life
Nancy Mann Waddel married mining engineer James Wilson Woodrow in 1897. He was a cousin of Woodrow Wilson. They divorced in 1905, but she was best known as "Mrs. Wilson Woodrow" for decades afterwards. Nancy Mann Waddel Woodrow died in 1935, aged about 60 years.

References

External links
  
 
 
 Nancy Mann Waddel Woodrow, "Secret Chambers" in Catherine A. Lundie, ed., Restless Spirits: Ghost Stories by American Women, 1872-1926 (University of Massachusetts Press 1996): 175-191. 

1860s births
1935 deaths
People from Chillicothe, Ohio
American women writers